Inkinga is a genus of sea snails, marine gastropod mollusks in the family Horaiclavidae.

It was previously included within the subfamily Crassispirinae, family Turridae.

Species
Species within the genus Inkinga include:
 Inkinga carnosa Kilburn, 2005
 Inkinga cockae (Kilburn, 1977)
 Inkinga platystoma (E. A. Smith, 1877)
Species brought into synonymy
 Inkinga macella J.C. Melvill, 1923: synonym of  Inkinga platystoma  (E.A. Smith, 1877)
 Inkinga macilenta J.C. Melvill, 1923: synonym of Inkinga platystoma  (E.A. Smith, 1877)
 Inkinga ordinaria W.H. Turton, 1932: synonym of  Inkinga platystoma  (E.A. Smith, 1877)
 Inkinga prolongata W.H. Turton, 1932: synonym of  Inkinga platystoma  (E.A. Smith, 1877)
 Inkinga wilkiae G.B. Sowerby, 1889: synonym of Inkinga platystoma  (E.A. Smith, 1877)

References

External links
 Bouchet, P.; Kantor, Y. I.; Sysoev, A.; Puillandre, N. (2011). A new operational classification of the Conoidea. Journal of Molluscan Studies. 77, 273-308

 
Horaiclavidae
Gastropod genera